Alfred Rouleau,  (August 19, 1915 – October 19, 1985) was a Canadian businessman and President of the Fédération du Québec des Caisses Populaires Desjardins, Quebec's largest credit union.

Born in Sherbrooke, Quebec, he was elected President of Desjardins in 1972 and served until 1981.

Honours
 In 1973 he was made a Companion of the Order of Canada.
 In 1985 he was made a Grand Officer of the National Order of Quebec.

External links
Alfred Rouleau at The Canadian Encyclopedia.

1915 births
1985 deaths
Businesspeople from Sherbrooke
Grand Officers of the National Order of Quebec
Companions of the Order of Canada
Université Laval alumni
20th-century Canadian businesspeople